The Climate, Community & Biodiversity Alliance (CCBA) is a partnership consisting of Conservation International, CARE, The Nature Conservancy, Rainforest Alliance, and the Wildlife Conservation Society that is primarily active in the field of land management activities.

The CCBA was established in 2003 with an aim to increase public and private investment in forest protection, restoration and agroforestry by developing standards intended to reduce the emissions of greenhouse gases.

The CCBA has two major initiatives:

The Climate, Community and Biodiversity Standards are in use by more than 100 projects around the world. The Climate, Community & Biodiversity (CCB) Standards enable investors, policymakers, project managers and civil society observers to evaluate land-based climate change mitigation projects by identifying high-quality projects that adopt best practices to generate significant benefits for local communities and biodiversity while delivering credible and robust carbon offsets.
The REDD+ Social and Environmental Standards are being developed in collaboration with the governments of Ecuador, Nepal and Tanzania.

History of the Standards

The CCB Standards have been developed through a process designed to be inclusive and transparent. The first draft was written by the NGO members of the CCBA and opened to the public for a 3-month comment period in 2004. Community and environmental groups, companies, academics, project developers and others contributed comments. The draft Standards were then field-tested on existing and planned projects in Indonesia, Tanzania, Peru, Bolivia, Ecuador, Scotland, and Madagascar. Based on the public comments and field test results, a second draft was created and turned over to three independent Advising Institutions. These institutions worked with the original Standards authors' to produce the First Edition of the Standards, which was released in May 2005.

In February 2008 the CCBA began a revision of the Standards as described in the Terms of Reference, Procedures and Work Plan for the Revision of the CCB Standards.  The CCB Standards were revised by a Standards Committee composed of a range of interested parties with expertise relevant to the subject matter of the standards and/or representatives of those who are materially affected by them. The revision process was completed in December 2008, and the CCB Standards Second Edition was launched on Dec 6, 2008, at Forest Day 2 in Poznan, Poland.  After another multi-stakeholder consultation process, the Third Edition of the CCB Standards was released in December 2013.

Use of the CCB Standards

The CCB Standards are an international standard for the multiple benefits of land-based carbon projects. The CCB Standards provide rules and guidance to encourage effective and integrated project design. The Standards can be applied early on during a project’s design phase to validate projects that have been well designed, are suitable to local conditions and are likely to achieve significant climate, community and biodiversity benefits. Such validation can help to build support for the project at a crucial stage and attract funding or other assistance from key stakeholders, including investors, governments and other important local, national and international partners.  The CCB Standards can be applied throughout the life of the project to evaluate the social and environmental impacts of land-based carbon projects. The standards can be combined with a carbon accounting standard, such as, the CarbonFix Standard (CFS), the Clean Development Mechanism (CDM) or the Voluntary Carbon Standard (VCS).

The Standards, now managed by the non-profit Verra, have been applied to nearly 200 projects, over 50 of which have achieved full verification. The projects cover over 60 countries on every continent except Antarctica. Projects validated and verified to the Standards encompass more than 10 million hectares.

Structure of the CCB Standards

The Standards comprise fourteen required criteria and three optional "Gold Level” criteria. Once a project has been designed, a third-party evaluator uses indicators to determine if individual criteria are satisfied. Only projects that use best practices and deliver significant climate, community and biodiversity benefits earn CCB approval. Gold status is awarded to projects that satisfy one of the optional criteria by providing exceptional benefits including explicit design for adaptation to climate change, benefits for globally poorer communities, or conservation of biodiversity at sites of global conservation significance.

CCB Standards Validation and Verification Process

The first step is an internal desk review of the project design against the CCB Standards. From here, any need for revision in the project's design, or gathering of documentation (evidence) for the audit is looked into.

Subsequently, an independent verifier does the CCB audit and validates the project. Currently, eligible CCB verifiers are accredited CDM verification bodies (Designated Operational Entities - DOEs). Once an independent verifier is chosen, a project design document (PDD) can be created, with the assistance of the CCB Validation Guidance document, and submitted to the CCBA for validation.  The CCB audit and validation usually takes about two months or sometimes more depending on the audit findings. Typically, the CCB auditor reviews all the project documents and once they find that the documentation is sufficient and appropriate to proceed with an audit they forward the documents to the CCBA for the mandatory public comment period.  Once the auditor evaluates the responses they write up the final audit & validation report and forward this with their statement of conformance to CCB Standards to the CCBA for publication on the CCBA website. In the end, the project is deemed “CCB validated”.

Combined Use with Other Certification Systems

The CCB Standards can be combined with many other standards, such as the Clean Development Mechanism, or the Verified Carbon Standard. In this case, the CCB Standards provide a basis for evaluating a project’s social and environmental impact, while the carbon accounting standard enables verification and registration of quantified greenhouse gas emissions reductions or removals. In this way, the CCB Standards verify the social and environmental benefits generated by the project, enabling investors to select carbon credits with additional benefits, while screening out projects with unacceptable social and environmental impacts.

See also

CarbonFix Standard
CARE
Clean Development Mechanism
Conservation International
The Nature Conservancy
Reducing emissions from deforestation and forest degradation
Verified Carbon Standard
 Plan Vivo Standard

References

Environmental organizations based in Virginia